William Eugene Bufalino (April 13, 1918 – May 12, 1990) was an American attorney who represented the International Brotherhood of Teamsters (IBT) from 1947 until 1971. He retired in 1982. Bufalino worked closely with Jimmy Hoffa until 1971. Bufalino died on May 12, 1990.

Early life
Bufalino was born on April 13, 1918, in Pittston, Pennsylvania, to Salvatore and Louise Bufalino, Italian immigrants from Montedoro, Sicily. He was one of nine children in a coal mining family. He studied for the Roman Catholic priesthood for two years before switching to law. He graduated from Dickinson School of Law in 1942 and served in World War II as a lieutenant in the Army's Judge Advocate General Corps.

In 1945, after he returned from the Army, Bufalino married Marie Antoinette Meli, sister of Detroit mobster Vincent Meli and niece of crime boss Angelo Meli, then began practicing law in 1947. Bufalino had a son, William Jr., and four daughters, Louise, Grace Ann, Toni and Fran.

Career
Bufalino represented union leader Jimmy Hoffa for nearly 25 years. He helped the union and Hoffa fight racketeering charges. Bufalino represented the union in seven trials, winning five. Hoffa was eventually jailed for jury tampering.

Bufalino was a Teamster official for 20 years serving as president of Local 985 in the Detroit-area. A Senate investigation portrayed Local 985 as "a collection agency for gangster-dominated operators". Bufalino was repeatedly accused of Mafia connections. He sued Senator John L. McClellan, an Arkansas Democrat, and Robert F. Kennedy for damaging his reputation with accusations of connections to organized crime. He lost the lawsuit.

Hoffa disappeared on July 30, 1975. Bufalino claimed Hoffa was killed by the Central Intelligence Agency because of his knowledge of an alleged government plot to use Mafia members to assassinate Cuban president Fidel Castro.

Death
Bufalino died of leukemia on May 12, 1990, at Holy Cross Hospital in Fort Lauderdale, Florida. He is buried in Holy Sepulchre Cemetery in Michigan.

In popular culture
Bufalino is portrayed by Ray Romano in Martin Scorsese's 2019 crime film The Irishman.

References

External links

1918 births
1990 deaths
20th-century American lawyers
United States Army personnel of World War II
American people of Italian descent
Burials in Michigan
Dickinson School of Law alumni
International Brotherhood of Teamsters people
Military personnel from Pennsylvania
People from Pittston, Pennsylvania
United States Army officers
United States Army Judge Advocate General's Corps